Pa'amei Tashaz is a moshav in southern Israel. Located in the northwestern Negev between Netivot and Rahat, it falls under the jurisdiction of Merhavim Regional Council.

History
The moshav was established in 1953 by immigrants from Iran. It was named for the 11 outposts in the Negev established in October 1946 (Tashaz in the Hebrew calendar).

References

External links
Pa'amei Tashaz Negev Information Centre

Iranian-Jewish culture in Israel
Moshavim
Populated places established in 1953
Populated places in Southern District (Israel)
1953 establishments in Israel